Sine dicendo is an inherently superfluous statement, the truth  of which can be taken for granted. When put under scrutiny, it becomes  apparent that the statement has not added any new or useful information to the conversation (e.g. 'It's always in the last place you look').

Figures of speech